Simone Lorraine Hankin  (born 28 February 1973 in Sydney) is an Australian water polo player from the gold medal squad of the 2000 Summer Olympics.

See also
 Australia women's Olympic water polo team records and statistics
 List of Olympic champions in women's water polo
 List of Olympic medalists in water polo (women)

References

External links
 

1973 births
Living people
Australian female water polo players
Olympic gold medalists for Australia in water polo
Water polo players at the 2000 Summer Olympics
Sportswomen from New South Wales
Water polo players from Sydney
Medalists at the 2000 Summer Olympics
Recipients of the Medal of the Order of Australia